Filifactor, is a genus of bacteria in the family Peptostreptococcaceae.

References

Peptostreptococcaceae
Bacteria genera
Taxa described in 1994